"When I Die" is a 1969 hit single by Motherlode.  It is the title track of their debut LP and was their first single.

In the US, the song reached number 18 on the Billboard Hot 100 and number 12 on the Cash Box Top 100. "When I Die" was a major hit in Canada, reaching number 1 in August of the year.

Charts

Weekly charts

Year-end charts

References

External links
 

1969 songs
1969 singles
Buddah Records singles
Revolver Records singles
RPM Top Singles number-one singles
Motherlode (band) songs